Timoléon C. Brutus (1886–1971) was a Haitian politician and historian. He was Foreign Minister of Haiti from 1946 to 1949. As a historian, Brutus wrote books about the leaders of the Haitian Revolution, Toussaint L'Ouverture and Jean-Jacques Dessalines. His most well-known works are Ranςon du Génie ou la Leςon de Toussaint Louverture (1945) and L'homme d'Airain (1946). One of his sons, Edner Brutus, also became a prominent politician and historian. His youngest son, Jean-Claude Brutus became a psychiatrist.

References
 

1886 births
1971 deaths
Foreign Ministers of Haiti
20th-century Haitian historians
Haitian male writers
Haitian diplomats
20th-century male writers